The 1996–97 Pro Tour season was the second season of the Magic: The Gathering Pro Tour. It began on 13 September 1996 with Pro Tour Atlanta, and ended on 17 August 1997 with the conclusion of 1997 World Championship in Seattle. The season consisted of five Grand Prix, and six Pro Tours, located in Atlanta, Dallas, Los Angeles, Paris, New York, and Seattle. At the end of the season Paul McCabe from Canada was awarded the Pro Player of the year title. It was the first season to host Grand Prix, which are major tournaments awarding cash prizes and Pro Points, but open to all players.

Mode 

Six Pro Tours were held in the 1996–97 season. Five Grand Prixs were held in the season. However, they did not award Pro Points. Based on final Pro Tour standings Pro Points were awarded as follows:

Pro Tour – Atlanta (13–15 September 1996) 

Atlanta was the only Pro Tour ever to host an individual Sealed Deck competition as the main event. Furthermore, the cards were all previously unknown to the players as Mirage product was used, but Mirage had not been officially released yet. Also Atlanta was the first Pro Tour that allowed players to intentionally draw matches. In the end German Frank Adler won Pro Tour Atlanta over Darwin Kastle.

Tournament data 
Prize pool: $150,000 ($250,000 including Team Competition and scholarships for the Junior Division)
Players: 192
Format: Sealed Deck (Mirage)

Final standings

Other divisions 

Aaron Souders won the Junior Division against Louis Beryl. Jason Gordon and Daniel Connelly were the other semi-finalists. The quarter-finalists were David Lively, Trevor Blackwell, James Murphy, and Alexander Sutherland. The team of Mark Chalice, Scott Johns, Mark Justice, Preston Poulter, and Mario Robaina won the Team Competition against Dave Lyon, Mike Reinking, Kevin Stelzer, Jeff Sternal, and Chris Stelzer for a prize of $11,000.

Pro Tour – Dallas (22–24 November 1996) 

Eventual Pro Player of the year Paul McCabe won Pro Tour Dallas. The Canadian defeated Jason Zila from the US in the final. Olle Råde had his third Top 8 appearance while playing only his fourth Pro Tour. Pro Tour Dallas also featured a Type I (now Vintage) division, which Scott Johns won. Justin Schneider won the Junior Division for $16,000 scholarship over Jeremy Baca in the finals. Eventual Hall of Famer Patrick Chapin and Jeff Simoneau lost in the semi-finals.

Tournament data 
Prize pool: $150,000 ($250,000 including Classic Division and Junior Division scholarships)
Players: 242
Format: Standard

Final standings

Top 8

Junior Division 

Justin Schneider won the finals of the Junior Division against Jeremy Baca for a $16,000 scholarship. The other semi-finalists were Patrick Chapin and Jeff Simoneau. The quarter-finalists were Jason Moungey, Vinnie Falcone, Yubin Tao, and Adam Jansen.

Pro Tour – Los Angeles (28 February – 2 March 1997) 

Tommi Hovi won Pro Tour Los Angeles, winning the final against David Mills. It was the only Pro Tour final ever to be decided by a disqualification. Mills was disqualified because he repeatedly tapped his lands after (rather than before) attempting to play a spell, which was not allowed at the time. Leading to an upset amongst the players it was eventually decided that Mills would be allowed to claim his prize, despite being originally disqualified without prize.

Los Angeles was also the first Pro Tour to use the so-called Paris Mulligan. Previously players were allowed to take a mulligan if they had an all-land or no-land starting hand. Instead players could now mulligan whenever they wished to do so, but had to draw an opening hand with one card less. The name Paris Mulligan actually refers to the subsequent Pro Tour in Paris, which was the first Constructed Pro Tour to use this rule.

Jess Means won the finals of the Junior Division against eventual Hall of Famer Zvi Mowshowitz.

Tournament data 

Prize pool: $150,000
Players: 236
Format: Rochester Draft (Mirage-Visions)
Head Judge: Tom Wylie

Final standings

Grand Prix – Amsterdam 

GP Amsterdam (22–23 March)

Pro Tour – Paris (11–13 April 1997) 

Paris was the first Pro Tour held outside the United States. In the finals, the biggest names of Magic at the time (Mike Long and Mark Justice) met to determine the champion. Both decks present in the final belonged to Long as he had previously loaned his deck to Justice. Eventually Long won the match, en route winning a game which his Combo deck was not capable of winning any more, but he convinced Justice to concede anyway.

Tournament data 

Prize pool: $150,000
Players: 223
Format: Mirage Block Constructed (Mirage, Visions)

Final standings

Grand Prix – Washington D.C., Tokyo, Barcelona

GP Washington D.C. (26–27 April)

GP Tokyo (4–5 May)

GP Barcelona (4–5 May)

Pro Tour – New York (30 May – 1 June 1997) 

Canadian Terry Borer won Pro Tour New York, defeating Ivan Stanoev in the finals. In the finals of Junior Division Ron Franke beat Jamie Parke.

Tournament data 

Prize pool: $150,000
Players: 259
Format: Booster Draft (5th Edition-Visions)

Final standings

Grand Prix – London

GP London (12–13 July)

1997 World Championships – Seattle (13–17 August 1997) 

Jakub Slemr from the Czech Republic won the World Championship. He defeated Janosch Kühn from Germany in the final, playing a mainly black aggro-deck, dipping into all other colours for utility. Canada won the team competition in a final against Sweden.

Tournament data 

Prize pool: $200,000 (individual) + $50,000 (national teams)
Players: 153
Format: Standard, Rochester Draft (Mirage-Visions-Weatherlight), Extended

Final standings

National team competition 

 Canada (Gary Krakower, Michael Donais, Ed Ito, Gabriel Tsang)
 Sweden (Nikolai Weibull, Mattias Jorstedt, Marcus Angelin, Johan Cedercrantz)

Pro Player of the year final standings 

After the World Championship Paul McCabe was awarded the Pro Player of the year title.

References 

Magic: The Gathering professional events